Wang Zhiming (1907 – December 29, 1973) was a Miao pastor little known outside his home in Wuding County, Yunnan, China at the time of his execution on December 29, 1973. Since then, he has received two unique honors. In 1981, he became the only Christian martyr of the Cultural Revolution to have a monument erected at his gravesite. Then in 1998, he was one of ten 20th-century Christian martyrs memorialized above the Great West Door of Westminster Abbey with a statue. These statues represent those who died in the name of Christ in the century marked by the greatest number of martyrdoms in the history of the church.

Wang was heavily respected and admired for his work. He died for his passion and beliefs.

Life and work 

Wang Zhiming was born in Wuding in 1907, the year after Christian missionaries Samuel Pollard, Arthur G. Nicholls, George E. Metcalf and Gladstone Porteous first began work there. Their work among minority people, especially the Miao in Wuding, saw much fruit. By 1949, 130,000 Protestants, nearly 20% of the total for China, were found among Yunnan's minorities. Five years later half of the Christians in Yunnan reportedly lived in the prefecture which included Wuding. 

Wang was educated in Christian schools and later taught in one for ten years. In 1944 he was elected chairman of the church council in Wuding, and he was ordained in 1951 at the age of 44. During the 1950s Wang was one of six Miao Christian leaders who accommodated some of the demands of the new government by signing the Three Self Manifesto. Still, he refused to participate in denunciation meetings held to humiliate landlords, saying, "My hands have baptized many converts, and should not be used for sinfulness". This was undoubtedly one of the reasons that, even before the Cultural Revolution, Wang was declared a counter-revolutionary.

Martyrdom 

During the Cultural Revolution (1966–1976), at least 21 Christian leaders in Wuding were imprisoned, and many others were sent to camps, denounced or beaten. One later stated,

In 1969, Wang Zhiming and his wife and sons were arrested. On December 29, 1973, Wang was executed in a stadium in front of more than 10,000 people. The largely Christian crowd was not cowed into submission by the spectacle, but rather many rushed to stand where they were berated by the prosecuting officials.

Legacy 

After the Cultural Revolution, official attempts to placate the Miao included a compensatory payment of 1,300 yuan (then $250) to Wang's family. However, the real compensation for the great suffering of Wang and the other Christians in Wuding has come in church growth. When Wang Zhiming was arrested, there were 2,795 Christians in Wuding. By 1980 the church had grown to about 12,000, and Wuding now has over 30,000 Christians and more than 100 places of worship. Sporadic persecution in Wuding continues.

In 2014, a documentary about Wang's life and community was released by filmmaker Hu Jie.

References

 Hattaway, Paul. Operation China,  Piquant, 1990. .
 Wickeri, Philip L. "The Abolition of Religion in Yunnan: Wang Zhiming" in The Terrible Alternative: Christian Martyrdom in the Twentieth Century. Mowbray, 1998. .
 Tien Ju-Kang, Peaks of Faith: Protestant Mission in Revolutionary China. Brill, 1993. .

External links
 Wang Zhiming at Westminster Abbey website

1907 births
1973 deaths
Chinese Protestants
20th-century Protestant martyrs
20th-century executions by China
Executed People's Republic of China people
People executed by China by firearm
Victims of the Cultural Revolution
People from Chuxiong
Victims of anti-Christian violence
Miao people
Executed Chinese people
Executed people from Yunnan